Hour Of Restoration is the debut album by the band Magellan. It was released on September 24, 1991.

Track listing

"Magna Carta" - 14:47         
"The Winner" - 2:08                
"Friends of America" - 3:29    
"Union Jack" - 9:10            
"Another Burning" - 5:05       
"Just One Bridge" - 2:16       
"Breaking These Circles" - 5:18
"Turning Point" - 1:25

Credits 
Trent Gardner - lead vocals, keyboards
Wayne Gardner - guitars, backing vocals
Hal Stringfellow Imbrie - bass, backing vocals
Magellan - drums, percussion

References

External links
Encyclopaedia Metallum page

Magellan (band) albums
1997 debut albums